Robert Shackleton CBE (25 November 1919 – 9 September 1986) was an English French language philologist and librarian.

Shackleton was born in Todmorden, now in West Yorkshire. He was educated at Oriel College, Oxford, and taught French at Brasenose College, Oxford, from 1946 to 1966. He also served as college librarian from 1948 to 1966. From 1966 to 1979 he served as Bodley's Librarian, the director of the Bodleian Library. From 1979 to 1986 he was Marshal Foch Professor of French Literature at the university, a position that carried with it a Fellowship at All Souls College, Oxford.

He was appointed a Commander of the Order of the British Empire (CBE) in 1986.

He was a bibliophile who amassed a considerable collection of books relating to the Enlightenment, much of which is now in the John Rylands Library in Manchester. He also bequeathed a collection of c.1,000 volumes concerning Charles de Secondat, Baron de Montesquieu (1689-1755) to the Bodleian Library. He is the author of Montesquieu: A Critical Biography (Oxford University Press, 1961), a standard introduction to Montesquieu's life and thought as well as to the historical and intellectual background.

References

External links
Dictionary of National Biography
Memorial essay in the Proceedings of the British Academy

1919 births
1986 deaths
People from Todmorden
Alumni of Oriel College, Oxford
English philologists
Bodley's Librarians
English librarians
Fellows of Brasenose College, Oxford
Fellows of All Souls College, Oxford
Commanders of the Order of the British Empire
Marshal Foch Professors of French Literature
English book and manuscript collectors
Liberal Party (UK) politicians